Giovanni Vincenzo "Gianni" Infantino (born 23 March 1970) is a Swiss football administrator and the current president of FIFA. He was first elected to the office during the 2016 FIFA Extraordinary Congress in February 2016, was re-elected in June 2019 and in March 2023. In January 2020, he was also elected a member of the International Olympic Committee.

Early life and education 
Infantino was born on 23 March 1970 in Brig, Switzerland. He is a son of Italian immigrant parents from Calabria and Lombardy in Switzerland and owns the citizenship of both countries. He studied law at the University of Fribourg. He is fluent in Italian, Spanish, French, and German, and also speaks English, Portuguese, and Arabic.

Career 
Infantino worked as the Secretary General of the International Center for Sports Studies (CIES) at the University of Neuchâtel.

UEFA 
Infantino started working with UEFA in August 2000 and was appointed as the Director of UEFA's Legal Affairs and Club Licensing Division in January 2004. He became Deputy General Secretary of UEFA in 2007 and Secretary General of UEFA in October 2009. During his time there, UEFA introduced Financial Fair Play and improved commercial support to smaller national associations.

He oversaw the expansion of UEFA Euro 2016 to 24 teams and played a role in the conception of the UEFA Nations League and the UEFA Euro 2020, which took place in then 13 (now 11) European nations.

In 2015, the Greek government decided to introduce a new sports law in response to the recent scandal and acts of violence and corruption mainly in Greek football. Gianni Infantino, as UEFA's general secretary, led the negotiations with the Greek government and supported the Hellenic Football Federation's warning to Greece that it faced suspension from international football for government interference.

FIFA 

Infantino was a member of FIFA's Reform Committee. On 26 October 2015, he received the backing of the UEFA Executive Committee to stand for the position of president in the 2016 FIFA Extraordinary Congress. On the same day, he confirmed his candidacy and submitted the required declarations of support. He promised to expand the FIFA World Cup to forty teams.

On 26 February 2016, he was elected FIFA President for a period of three years. Infantino, who holds dual Swiss and Italian citizenship through his parents, became the first Italian to hold the Presidency of FIFA.

In 2017, Infantino criticized the United States travel ban on several Muslim-majority nations. He said "When it comes to FIFA competitions, any team, including the supporters and officials of that team, who qualify for a World Cup need to have access to the country, otherwise there is no World Cup. That is obvious."

In 2019 Infantino accepted the Order of Friendship medal given to him by Vladimir Putin, following the 2018 World Cup.

Women's rights 

In Iran, after the 1979 Islamic revolution, women had been banned from stadiums when men's teams are playing. Infantino repeatedly warned Iranian football federation and Islamic Republic of Iran authorities about Iranian women's rights. On 8 September 2019, Sahar Khodayari self-immolated after being arrested for trying to enter a stadium.
Our position is clear and firm. Women have to be allowed into football stadiums in Iran. Now is the moment to change things.

Infantino, September 2019
Following that incident, FIFA assured Iranian women that they would be able to attend stadiums starting from October 2019. On 10 October 2019, more than 3,500 women attended the Azadi Stadium for a World Cup qualifier against Cambodia.

Migrant workers in the 2022 World Cup
With the holding of the World Cup in Qatar, the issue of migrant workers' rights attracted attention. Qatar has been accused of unpaid wages, imposing excessive working hours, illegal recruitment, and the deaths of workers who helped build Qatar stadiums.
When questioned about abuses suffered by migrant workers involved in preparations for the 2022 FIFA World Cup in Qatar, Infantino said that migrant workers were given work and pay and were proud to contribute to constructing the stadiums. The tournament has been condemned by human rights group Amnesty International, who have alleged that workers were subject to forced labor.
On 19th November 2022, due to backlash against the way migrant workers were treated while making stadiums for the 2022 Fifa World Cup, he declared he felt Qatari, Arab, African, gay, disabled and like a migrant worker.
On November 19, 2022, just before the start of the World Cup, Infantino charged Western countries with "hypocrisy" for criticizing Qatar on moral grounds. He told reporters during an hour-long monologue, "What we Europeans have been doing for the last 3,000 years, we should be apologizing for the next 3,000 years before starting to give moral lessons."
Infantino also used the speech to accuse Western companies operating in Qatar of hypocrisy for profiting while not discussing the rights of migrant workers with Qatari authorities.
Norwegian national team coach Ståle Solbakken responded to Infantino's outburst by saying that Infantino is not fit to teach anyone about morals and ethics, and that Infantino is neither a great sports leader nor a great historian.

Panama Papers 
Infantino was implicated in the FIFA corruption scandal in documents released in the 2016 Panama Papers. They show that UEFA undertook deals with indicted figures where previously they had denied any relationship. Infantino has stated he is "dismayed" at the reports and that he has never personally dealt with the parties involved.

FIFA ethics investigations 
In July 2016, Infantino was suspected to have broken the FIFA code of ethics and was interviewed by the investigatory chamber of the FIFA Ethics Committee.

The investigation was focused on three areas: "several flights taken by Mr. Infantino during the first months of his presidency, human resources matters related to hiring processes in the president's office, and Mr. Infantino's refusal to sign the contract specifying his employment relationship with FIFA".

Even though a document was leaked which showed illegitimate spending of funds by FIFA the matter concerning expenses and governance was not investigated. The document revealed that Infantino had billed FIFA for personal expenses such as £8,795 for mattresses at his home, £6,829 for a stepper exercise machine, £1,086 for a tuxedo, £677 on flowers and £132 on personal laundry. In addition to that he billed the FIFA governing body for an external driver for his family and advisors while he was away.

When Infantino accepted special treatment by the 2018 and 2022 World Cup hosts Russia and Qatar, the question of a potential conflict of interest was raised. The hosts had organized private jets for Infantino and his staff related to visits in Russia and Qatar. The investigatory chamber was of the opinion that no violation had occurred. In addition to that, the chamber found that "human resources matters, as well as Mr. Infantino's conduct with regard to his contract with FIFA, if at all, constituted internal compliance issues rather than an ethical matter."

While the investigatory chamber discharged Infantino, this did not stop criticism. Karl-Heinz Rummenigge, chairman of FC Bayern Munich, criticized Infantino for not fulfilling his promises regarding transparency, democracy and governance. "So far this has not succeeded in my eyes," he complained.

Lauber offered to resign after a court said he covered up the meeting and lied to supervisors during an investigation by his office into corruption surrounding FIFA. Infantino responded to the allegation by defending himself claiming "To meet with the attorney general of Switzerland is perfectly legitimate and it's perfectly legal. It's no violation of anything."

Personal life 
Infantino is married to Lebanese Leena Al Ashqar; the couple have four children. He lives in Zug, Switzerland. He has a second home in Qatar, as he was often on site in the year the 2022 World Cup is being held. He is a fan of the Italian club Inter Milan.

References

External links 

Biography on FIFA website

1970 births
Living people
Swiss people of Italian descent
Swiss businesspeople
Italian football chairmen and investors
Swiss football chairmen and investors
Members of the UEFA Executive Committee
Presidents of FIFA
Swiss people of Calabrian descent
People of Lombard descent
People from Brig-Glis
University of Fribourg alumni
People named in the Panama Papers
International Olympic Committee members